The men's 1500 metre freestyle competition of the swimming events at the 1973 World Aquatics Championships took place on September 8.

Records
Prior to the competition, the existing world and championship records were as follows.

The following records were established during the competition:

Results
26 swimmers participated in 4 heats. The event was a timed final. The first three heats were contested in the morning with the fourth and final heat contested in the evening.

References

Freestyle 1500 metre, men's
World Aquatics Championships